Cheung Po Tsai (born  Cheung Po; 1783–1822) was a navy colonel of the Qing dynasty and former pirate. "Cheung Po Tsai" literally means "Cheung Po the Kid". He was known to the Portuguese Navy as Quan Apon Chay during the Battle of the Tiger's Mouth.

History

Early life

Cheung Po was born in 1783. He was a son of a Tanka fisherman who lived in Xinhui of Jiangmen.

Piratical career
Around 1798, he was abducted at age 15 by the pirate Cheng I, who pressed him into piracy.

His natural talent helped him adapt to his unplanned new career and he rose through the ranks swiftly. Cheung Po Tsai was later adopted by Cheng I and Ching I Sao; "wife of Cheng I"; married 1801) as their step-son, making him Cheng's legal heir.

Cheung Po Tsai's piracy mate and lieutenant was Cai Qian and the two worked together. Cai Qian had strong connections to the Western weapon dealers as his wife Lu Shi ("Mrs. Lu"), best known by her nickname Cai Qian Ma ("wife of Cai Qian"), was fluent in English and was an expert in Western weaponry.

Rise to command
After Cheng I died suddenly in Vietnam on 16 November 1807, his widow Ching Shih acted quickly to solidify the partnership with her step-son Cheung Po Tsai. Their first success came when they were able to secure the loyalty of Cheng's relatives, who were leaders in the fleet. They became lovers within weeks.

As Ching Shih's second-in-command, Cheung Po Tsai was active along the Guangdong coastal area during the Qing dynasty. Their followers were said to have reached 50,000+ and his fleet said to have possessed 600 ships.

The tide began to turn in 1809. The authorities managed to discover that Cai Qian was docked in the coastal town of Wuzhen, Zhejiang province. The new naval leaders, Wang Delu and Qiu Lianggong, blockaded him into the port and attacked, sinking Cai Qian's ship and killing him.

Battle of the Tiger's Mouth

In September and November 1809, Cheung Po Tsai's pirate fleet suffered a series of defeats inflicted by the Portuguese Navy at the Battle of the Tiger's Mouth.

Battle of Chek Lap Kok

On 20 April 1810 at Furongsha in Guangdong, Cheung Po Tsai formally delivered his fleet and weapons, which now numbered about 280 ships, 2,000 guns and over 25,000 men. The Portuguese claimed naught, while the governor of Guangdong  accepted his surrender.

As Qing Naval Officer
Cheung and Ching accepted an amnesty offered by the Qing government, ending their career and allowed to keep the loot. Cheung Po Tsai reverted to his former name. Afterwards, he was capitulated to the Qing dynasty government and became a captain in the Qing's Guangdong navy, receiving the rank of navy colonel. He was given a command of a total of 30 ships, allowed to retain 30 private fleets, and an appointment in Penghu. He would spend the rest of his life helping the government to fight other pirates.

Cheung Po and Ching Shih were later married with Governor Bailing as witness.

Cheung Po would make future formal visits to the Leal Senado of Macau to meet several of the Portuguese officers who present at the fighting, among them was Gonçalves Carocha.

In 1813, Ching Shih gave birth to his son, Cheung Yu Lin. She would later have a daughter who was born at an unknown date.

Death
After Cheung Po died at sea in 1822 at age 39, his widow moved the family to Macau and there she opened a gambling house and was involved in the salt trade.

Legacy

Several places in Hong Kong are linked to Cheung Po Tsai:

 Cheung Po Tsai Cave, on Cheung Chau island. It is a small natural cave, said to be the place where he stored his prizes. In addition, there are also Cheung Po Tsai Caves at Lamma Island, Tap Mun, Sai Wan, Chung Hom Kok, Chek Chau, Siu Kau Yi Chau and Longxue Island, Guangzhou.
 Cheung Po Tsai built several temples dedicated to the goddess Tin Hau and seafaring activities on Ma Wan, Cheung Chau, and Stanley.

In popular culture
 The 1973 Hong Kong action film The Pirate (大海盜) has Cheung Po Tsai as its lead character, he was portrayed by Ti Lung.
 The 1983 Hong Kong action film Project A depicts a character based on Cheung Po Tsai. The lead villain, San Po (played by Dick Wei) is a pirate with similar characteristics. Project A'''s time period is a composite of several in Hong Kong's history.
 The 1994 Hong Kong action film Once Upon a Time in China V has Cheung Po Tsai as one of the main villains opposing the protagonist Wong Fei-Hung. As the movie apocryphally takes place shortly after the Boxer Rebellion, however (over seventy years after Cheung Po Tsai had historically lived), Cheung is depicted in that movie as an extremely old man.
 The movie Pirates of the Caribbean: At World's End depicts a pirate named Sao Feng as a member of the Brethren Court. This character is based on Cheung Po Tsai, although the film was set many years before he lived. He is portrayed by actor Chow Yun-Fat.
 In the anime One Piece, one of the characters, Scratchman Apoo, is influenced by Cheung Po Tsai.
 The Aqua Luna junk ship is named after Cheung Po Tsai.
 Tony Hung portrays Cheung Po Tsai in the 2015 Hong Kong television drama Captain of Destiny'', a historical sci-fi series about a 21st-century police officer who meets Cheung Po Tsai after traveling back in time.
The urban legend of Cheung Po Tsai was one of the twelve legends referenced on the TVB series Our Unwinding Ethos.

See also
Pirates of the South China Coast

References

External links

Cheung Po Tsai Cave at discoverhongkong.com
Pictures of the cave

Cheung Chau
1783 births
1822 deaths
18th-century Chinese people
19th-century Chinese people
19th-century pirates
Chinese adoptees
Cheung, Po Tsai
People from Xinhui District
Tanka people
Qing dynasty military personnel
Chinese Navy officers